Edward Fairchild may refer to:

Edward Henry Fairchild (1815–1889), American educator
Edward T. Fairchild (judge) (1872–1965), American jurist and legislator
Edward Thomson Fairchild (1866–1917), President of the New Hampshire College of Agriculture and Mechanical Arts
Ned Fairchild (1929–2015), pen name of Nelda Fairchild, American songwriter